Juan Carlos Caballero Martín (born 29 September 1978) is a Spanish football manager and former player who played as a goalkeeper.

Club career
Born in Zaragoza, Aragon, Caballero spent the vast majority of his career in the Segunda División B, appearing in 279 matches in representation of ten clubs, mainly FC Cartagena. In the summer of 2002 he moved straight from the lower leagues to La Liga after leaving UE Figueres to sign with Sevilla FC, but he played understudy to Antonio Notario during his spell, his only competitive appearance arriving on 21 June 2003 (the last day of the season) in a 0–3 home loss against Valencia CF.

Caballero retired in 2013 at the age of 35 shortly after being relegated from the third tier with Orihuela CF, who had released him midway through the campaign. He also played two years in Chile, appearing for C.D. Cobreloa in the 2009 edition of the Primera División.

References

External links

1978 births
Living people
Spanish footballers
Footballers from Zaragoza
Association football goalkeepers
La Liga players
Segunda División players
Segunda División B players
CA Osasuna B players
UE Figueres footballers
Sevilla FC players
Terrassa FC footballers
SD Eibar footballers
Lorca Deportiva CF footballers
FC Cartagena footballers
Benidorm CF footballers
Alicante CF footballers
CD Teruel footballers
UB Conquense footballers
Orihuela CF players
Chilean Primera División players
Primera B de Chile players
Cobreloa footballers
Deportes La Serena footballers
Spanish expatriate footballers
Expatriate footballers in Chile
Spanish expatriate sportspeople in Chile
Spanish football managers
Spanish expatriate football managers
Spanish expatriate sportspeople in Ecuador
Expatriate football managers in Ecuador